St Michael's Church, Sutton-on-the-Hill is a Grade II* listed  parish church in the Church of England in Sutton on the Hill, Derbyshire.

History

The church dates from the 14th century, but with the exception of the chancel, was very heavily rebuilt in 1863 by the architects Giles and Brookhouse of Derby. The east window was filled with stained glass by Hardman & Co. of Birmingham. The chancel floor was laid with Minton encaustic tiles. A Gurney Stove was installed for heating. The contractor was W.H. and J. Slater.

Organ

The organ dates from 1881 and is by Harston & Son. A specification of the organ can be found on the National Pipe Organ Register.

Parish status

The church is in a joint parish with 
St John the Baptist's Church, Boylestone
St Michael and All Angels' Church, Church Broughton
St Chad's Church, Longford
All Saints' Church, Dalbury
Christ Church, Long Lane
St Andrew's Church, Radbourne
All Saints’ Church, Trusley

See also
Grade II* listed buildings in South Derbyshire
Listed buildings in Sutton on the Hill

References

Church of England church buildings in Derbyshire
Grade II* listed churches in Derbyshire